Leslie Grace Martínez (born January 7, 1995) is an American singer, songwriter, and actress. For her work as a singer she has received three Latin Grammy Award nominations. She starred as Nina Rosario in Jon M. Chu's film adaptation In the Heights (2021).

Early life and education
Leslie Grace Martínez was born to Dominican parents on January 7, 1995, in The Bronx, a borough of New York City. Her mother runs a hair salon in South Florida. She was raised in Davie, Florida and attended Indian Ridge Middle School and Western High School, where she participated in musicals, talent shows, and choral performances. Singing and dancing from a young age, Grace entertained them along with her five older siblings since she was two. She speaks English and Spanish.

Career

Music career
She recorded and released an independent Christian music album in partnership with CD Baby while in middle school. Her mainstream debut came with "Will You Still Love Me Tomorrow", a bilingual cover of the 1961 Shirelles hit. Her bachata-tinged rendition peaked at number one on both the Billboard Tropical Songs chart and Billboard Latin Airplay charts, making her the youngest female artist to do so. Her self-titled second studio album, Leslie Grace (2013), reached number four on the Billboard Latin Albums chart, and number three on the Billboard Tropical Albums chart.

Among her nominations are "Best Contemporary Tropical Album" at the 14th Annual Latin Grammy Awards (in which she sang along with the Zarkana cast of Cirque du Soleil), "Female Tropical Artist of the Year" and "Tropical Album of the Year" at the 26th Premio Lo Nuestro. In 2014 she also obtained nominations in the Billboard Awards in the categories of "New Artist of the Year" and "Hot Latin Songs, Artist of the Year, Female".

Among her tours abroad is her presentation on the Caribbean island of Curaçao at the North Sea Jazz Festival, and the tour of the United States with the musical director Rayner Marrero and several bachata musicians in 2013. She also performed on Sábado Gigante with Don Francisco, and at the Chile Telethon and at the closing of the same at the National Stadium of Chile, where she sang in front of approximately 60,000 people.

In mid-2016 she participated as captain of the Univision reality show Va por ti with Luis Coronel, Chiquis Rivera and the host Galilea Montijo. After releasing the single "Aire" with Maluma, they made a tour of 14 concerts through Mexico. In the same year she released the single "Nada de amor".

In January 2017 she collaborated with the duo Play-N-Skillz, Wisin and Frankie J in the reggaeton-style cover of Selena's song, "Si una vez". And in February of the same year she was nominated for the Premios Lo Nuestro in the category "Female Artist of the Year – Pop / Rock".

As of June 2015, Grace is the face of Colgate toothpaste and has signed a distribution deal with Sony Music Latin and a worldwide contract with Sony/ATV.

On April 12, 2018, her collaboration with Super Junior's "Lo Siento" was released on S.M. Entertainment's YouTube channel.

Film career
On April 11, 2019, it was announced that Grace would be starring as Nina Rosario in the 2021 film adaptation of Lin-Manuel Miranda's Tony Award-winning musical In the Heights. The film originally set for a 2020 release date was postponed due to the COVID-19 pandemic. It was released the following summer in movie theatres and HBO Max simultaneously. The film received near universal acclaim with many citing it as one of the best films of the year. Grace received praise from critics including David Ehrlich from IndieWire who wrote that she "shined" in the role. K. Austin Collins of Rolling Stone wrote, "Its highest accomplishment is that it succeeds as the star vehicle Hollywood seemed to demand." On July 21, 2021, Grace was cast as Barbara Gordon/Batgirl in HBO Max's Batgirl. In August 2022, Warner Bros. Discovery cancelled plans to release the film, which was nearing completion.

Filmography 
 Life (2017) – Student 3 (credited as Leila Grace Bostwick-Riddell)
 In the Heights (2021) – Nina Rosario
 Batgirl (unreleased) – Barbara Gordon / Batgirl

Discography

Studio albums
 Pasión (2009)
 Leslie Grace (2013)

Extended plays
 Lloviendo Estrellas (2015)

Singles
As lead artist

As featured artist

Awards and nominations

Lo Nuestro Awards

|-
| 2013
| Leslie Grace
| Tropical Female Artist
| 
|-
| 2014
| Leslie Grace
| Tropical Album
| 
|-
| 2014
| Leslie Grace
| Tropical Female Artist
| 
|-
| 2015
| Leslie Grace
| Tropical Female Artist
| 
|-
| 2016
| Leslie Grace
| Tropical Female Artist
| 
|-

Billboard Latin Music Awards

|-
| 2013
| Leslie Grace
| Songs Artist of the Year
| 
|-
| 2014
| Leslie Grace
| Artist of the Year Debut
| 
|-
| 2014
| Leslie Grace
| Female Artist of the Year
| 
|-

Latin Grammys

|-
| 
| Leslie Grace
| Best Contemporary Tropical Album
| 
|-
| 
| Lloviendo Estrellas
| Latin Grammy Award for Best Contemporary Tropical Album|Best Contemporary Tropical Album
| 
|-
| 
| "Como Duele el Silencio"
| Best Tropical Song
| 

Nickelodeon Mexico Kids' Choice Awards

References

External links

 
 
 
 

1995 births
Living people
American singers of Dominican Republic descent
American bachata musicians
Musicians from the Bronx
People from Davie, Florida
Singers from New York City
Sony Music Latin artists
Top Stop Music artists
21st-century American singers
21st-century American women singers
Hispanic and Latino American women singers
Hispanic and Latino American actresses
Women in Latin music
Latin music songwriters